Malak Shahadat Awan is a Pakistani politician who is currently serving as a member of the Senate of Pakistan from the Sindh since March 2021. He belongs to Pakistan Peoples Party Parliamentarians.

References
 Minister of state for law and Justice

Living people
Year of birth missing (living people)
Pakistani Senators 2021–2027
Pakistan People's Party politicians